Pholeomyia indecora is a species of freeloader fly in the family Milichiidae. It is distributed primarily in southern Canada, but has been reported in Florida, northern Alberta, and Idaho.

References

Milichiidae
Articles created by Qbugbot
Insects described in 1869